Blarney railway station was a terminus station on the Cork and Muskerry Light Railway (CMLR) in County Cork, Ireland. The station served Blarney, and was located on the south side of the town's main square, with Blarney Castle a short walk to the south west.

History

The station opened on 8 August 1887 when the CMLR began public operations.  Services were mostly one per two hours from 9am to 8pm, the first class return fare 1s 8p and the third class half that.

Passenger services were withdrawn on 31 December 1934.

Layout and routes
The station had a run-round loop, 3 dead end sidings, a turntable and a goods shed. Some of the station's structures remain, including the platform and station building, with the latter now occupied by a tourist gift shop.

GS&WR Station
The Great Southern and Western Railway (GS&WR) also had a station serving Blarney on their Mallow to Cork section of main line which had been open since 18 October 1849 and which had already been responsible for vastly increasing the number of tourists.  That station closed in 1963.

References

Notes

Sources

   
 

Disused railway stations in County Cork
Railway stations opened in 1887
Railway stations closed in 1934